Timothy J. Manchin (born July 6, 1955) is an American politician and attorney. He serves in the West Virginia House of Delegates since 2003. He was appointed to the seat vacated by the death of his uncle, A. James Manchin, in November 2003.

Early life, education, and law career
Tim Manchin was born in 1955 in Farmington, West Virginia to Ann Manchin and Joseph Manchin II. He graduated from Bridgeport High School. He got a B.S. cum laude from West Virginia University in 1977 and his J.D. from West Virginia College of Law in 1980. In 2011, after his law partner of 25 years became a West Virginia circuit court judge, Manchin founded the Manchin Injury Law Group in Fairmont, West Virginia.

He is a former president of West Virginia Trial Lawyers Association. He was also a board member of the City National Bank and the West Virginia Division of Labor Manufactured Housing.

West Virginia legislature

Elections
In 2003, Democratic Governor Bob Wise appointed Tim Manchin to the Marion County-based 43rd District after the seat was vacated by the death of his uncle, A. James Manchin. He was elected in 2004 with 23%. He was re-elected in 2006 (29%), 2008 (26%), and 2010 (21%).

Committee assignments
House committees
Banking and Insurance
Finance
Political Subdivisions (Chairman)
Senior Citizen Issues

Interim committees
Marcellus Shale (Chairman)
Water Resources (Chairman)
Finance
Finance Subcommittee C

2012 congressional election

According to Politico, Tim Manchin met with the Democratic Congressional Campaign Committee in December 2011 to talk about setting up a campaign in West Virginia's 1st congressional district, currently held by U.S. Congressman David McKinley (R-WV).

Personal life
He lives in Fairmont, Marion County, West Virginia with his wife Susan and their son. One of his uncles, A. James Manchin, was a state delegate, West Virginia Secretary of State, and State Treasurer. Another uncle, John Manchin, was Mayor of Farmington, West Virginia. One of his grandfathers, Joe Manchin I, was also Mayor of Farmington. A first cousin, Joe Manchin III, is a former Governor, West Virginia Secretary of State, State Senator, and State Delegate, who now serves as U.S. Senator. Another first cousin, Michael J. Aloi, serves as a federal Magistrate Judge in the Northern District of West Virginia.

References

External links
Delegate Tim Manchin official State House site

1955 births
Living people
Democratic Party members of the West Virginia House of Delegates
Manchin family
People from Farmington, West Virginia
West Virginia University alumni
West Virginia University College of Law alumni
West Virginia lawyers
21st-century American politicians
Lawyers from Fairmont, West Virginia
Politicians from Fairmont, West Virginia